Iurie Priganiuc (born 23 October 1978) is a Moldovan professional footballer who last played for FC Druzhba Maykop in Russian Second Division.

Football career
Priganiuc arrived in Russia in January 2005. He signed a three-year contract with FC Khimki.

International career
He played his last official game for Moldova on 12 October 2005. In the whole 2006 FIFA World Cup qualification, Priganiuc played in nine of Moldova's ten matches, missing one through suspension.

References

External links

1978 births
Living people
Moldovan footballers
Moldovan expatriate footballers
Moldova international footballers
Association football defenders
FC Nistru Cioburciu players
CS Tiligul-Tiras Tiraspol players
FC Sheriff Tiraspol players
Expatriate footballers in Russia
FC Khimki players
FC SKA-Khabarovsk players
FC Spartak Nizhny Novgorod players